Alyaksandr Valeryevich Pawlaw (born 18 August 1984) is a Belarusian professional football coach and former player.

Career statistics

Club

International

Statistics accurate as of match played 7 June 2013

Honours
 BATE Borisov
 Belarusian Premier League (6): 2009, 2010, 2011, 2012, 2013, 2014 
 Belarusian Cup (1): 2009–10
 Belarusian Super Cup (4): 2010, 2011, 2013, 2014

References

External links
 
 
 

1984 births
Living people
Belarusian footballers
Association football midfielders
Belarus international footballers
Belarusian expatriate footballers
Expatriate footballers in Kazakhstan
FC Dnepr Mogilev players
FC BATE Borisov players
FC Okzhetpes players
FC Shakhtyor Soligorsk players
Belarusian football managers
FC Vitebsk managers